is an original Japanese romantic comedy anime television series directed by Tomoki Kobayashi at Studio Gokumi and AXsiZ. It aired on TBS between January 5 and March 23, 2017.

The series is structured like an anthology series, with every four episodes taking place in an individualized continuity in which protagonist Shōichi Kamita ends up with a different girl, yet featuring all of the same characters.

Seiren is a sequel to the similarly-structured Amagami adaptation, set in the same high school, albeit 9 years later.

Plot
Shōichi Kamita is a second-year high school student who is worried about university exams and his future. In this point in his life, he comes into contact with various girls, and the series follows Shōichi and his relationships with them.

Characters

Main characters

 The protagonist of the series. A second year high school student who can't leave people in trouble alone. A bit of a pervert with a tendency to fantasize about naughty things, Shouichi is a lover of games, whether on home consoles, in arcades, or elsewhere.

 The class idol of class 2-B at Kibito High School and the runner-up of last year's "Miss Santa Contest". Described as a "modern day meddling princess", she is always cheerful and loves to eat, and is occasionally stubborn. She also has a part-time job working as a cook in a restaurant.

 A student in class 3-A at Kibito High School. She is skilled with her hands when playing video games or crafting original goods. She finds it hard for her to keep up a conversation with those who don't share her hobbies.

 A childhood friend of Shōichi and a first year student in Kibito High School. She is an honors student with high grades and loves to read Shōjo manga. She can act childish at times, which is an aspect of herself that she worries about.

Supporting characters

 Shouichi's childhood friend, and the younger brother of Ai Nanasaki from Amagami, who was a bit of a prankster in elementary school. Thanks to his elder sister's influence, he eventually grew a more calm personality and became more studious.

 The protagonist's only older sister who was last year's Miss Santa. She is in class 3-A at Kibito High School. With the personality of an air-headed idol, she naturally charms others, hence her popularity at her school. However, she secretly has a dirty mouth, swearing with little restraint.

 One of Hikari's friends who used to like Tatsuya.

 One of Hikari's friends who participates in the school's swimming club.

 Shōichi's and Ikuo's friend who hangs out with them in the arcade. He is popular with the girls in Kibito High School and has a deep interest for animals.

 A first-year high school student who is part of the Public Morals Committee.

 A second-year student and the current chairman of the Public Morals Committee in Kibito High School.

 The homeroom teacher for class 2-B in Kibito High School.

}

 A little bit naive about the world, she's a swimming club member from Sakuragawa East, an all girls' high school.

 She is the friend of Miu and is also a member of Sakuragawa East's swimming club.

 Hikari Tsuneki's classmate in the "Save Our Scores" class during a cram school summer seminar.

 Toru's brother who works as a teacher in a cram school. He also participates in the cram school's yearly summer seminar, where he wears sunglasses and carries a bamboo stick to appear strict among the students.

A third-year student in Kibito High School who is friends with Tomoe and Toru. She is also the president of the Home Ec Club until the second semester.

She is the president of the Home Ec Club after Shiori stepped down.

She is the vice-president of the Home Ec Club.

The son of the restaurant owner Hikari works for. He typically wears an eyepatch and plays in the arcade with his friends.

Media

Anime
TBS revealed plans for a new anime series, with Kisai Takyama working on the project. This original anime television adaption was later officially named Seiren. The series is directed by Tomoki Kobayashi at Studio Gokumi and AXsiZ. It aired on TBS in Japan from January 5, 2017 to March 23, 2017. The series was also simulcasted in the United States of America, Canada, Australia, New Zealand, and Latin America on Crunchyroll. The series uses an omnibus format, in which each major character arc is a self-contained four-episode story. These major arcs are focused on three characters: Hikari Tsuneki, Toru Miyamae, and Kyōko Tōno. However, it was also noted that there were plans for character arcs involving Miu Hiyama, Makoto Kamizaki, and Ruise Sanjō in the future.

The opening theme, is sung by Hanako Oku. There are three ending themes. The first theme, is sung by Ayane Sakura. The second theme,  is sung by Shino Shimoji. The third theme, is sung by Juri Kimura.

Episode list

Webcomic
These webcomics involve characters from Seiren and the dating simulation game, Amagami.

Notes

References

See also
Amagami
KimiKiss

External links
 

2017 anime television series debuts
AXsiZ
Anime with original screenplays
Animated romance television series
Crunchyroll anime
Japanese romantic comedy television series
Romantic comedy anime and manga
Studio Gokumi
TBS Television (Japan) original programming